Jaroslav Alexa (6 July 1949 – 5 August 2008) was a Czech athlete. He competed in the men's high jump at the 1968 Summer Olympics and the 1972 Summer Olympics.

References

External links
 

1949 births
2008 deaths
Athletes (track and field) at the 1968 Summer Olympics
Athletes (track and field) at the 1972 Summer Olympics
Czech male high jumpers
Olympic athletes of Czechoslovakia
Sportspeople from Brno